Tore Rydman (October 11, 1914 – January 3, 2003) was a Swedish curler.

In 1966 he was inducted into the Swedish Curling Hall of Fame.

Teams

References

External links
 

1914 births
2003 deaths
Swedish male curlers
Swedish curling champions
Sportspeople from Norrköping
20th-century Swedish people